The New England Commission of Higher Education (NECHE) is a voluntary, peer-based, non-profit membership organization that performs peer evaluation and accreditation of public and private universities and colleges in the United States and other countries. Until federal regulations changed on July 1, 2020, it was one of the seven regional accreditation organizations dating back 130 years. NECHE, which is now considered an institutional accreditor, is recognized by the United States Department of Education and the Council for Higher Education Accreditation.

Its headquarters are in Wakefield, Massachusetts. It accredits over 200 institutions primarily in Connecticut, Maine, Massachusetts, New Hampshire, Rhode Island, and Vermont.

See also
Higher education accreditation
List of recognized higher education accreditation organizations
Educational accreditation
New England Association of Schools and Colleges
United States Department of Education

References

External links
 Official website

School accreditors
College and university associations and consortia in the United States
Educational organizations based in the United States